One Man's Chorus gathers various essays and pieces of journalism written by Anthony Burgess throughout the later years of his life. It was published posthumously in 1998. The book is edited and introduced by Ben Forkner.

While several of the essays may be considered autobiographical, others contain Burgess's thoughts on a wide variety of subjects including geography, culture, linguistics, and novelists.

Contents
Introduction (by Ben Forkner)
Genius Loci
The Ball Is Free to Roll
Francophonia
Going North
Understanding the French
Never Again Again
Something About Malaysia
The Brigg
Winterreise
The Art of Liking Rome
France and Myself
Farewell (& Hello Again) Manchester
Life (of a Sort) in Venice
Manchester as Was

In Our Time (and Other Reflections)
Cut Off
The Royals
England in Europe
After This Our Exile
Thoughts on Time
The Jew and the Joke
The British Temper
The World Doesn't Like Gipsies
What Makes Comedy Comic?
Thoughts on the Thatcher Decade
Dirty Pictures
God and God's Voices

Ars Poetica
Success
The Celtic Sacrifice
Shaw as Musician
Ring
The Literature of the British from 1900 to 1982
All About Alice
Flann O'Brien A Prefatory Word
Artist's Life
Elgar non è volgare
The Gaudiness of Gaudí
Orson Welles: The Artist as Bricoleur
A Clockwork Orange Resucked
The Brotherhood
Why Were the Revolutionaries Reactionary?
Shakespeare the Poet
The Oriental Diseases of Fiction
Playing Hamlet with Hamlet
Graham Greene: A Reminiscence
Craft and Crucifixion—the Writing of Fiction
Strega in Do Maggiore
First Novel

Anniversaries and Celebrations
Joyce as Centenarian
Great Scott?
Rudyard Kipling and the White Man's Burden
Domesday
Lorenzo
Quiet Pioneer
Good Gluck
Unravelling Ravel
God Struck with His Wind
Celebrating T. S. Eliot, Parts I and II
Lord Olivier
Gerard Manley Hopkins 1844–1889
Two Hundred Years of the Bounty
Our Eternal Holmes
The Cold Eye of Yeats
Father of the OED
Chaplin on Stage
Evelyn Waugh: A Revaluation
James Joyce: Fifty Years After
Tolkien: A Centenary
Virginia Woolf Mortua 1941
Marilyn

One Man's Chorus: The Uncollected Writings
Carroll & Graf books
1998 books